Ferreiros is a city located in the state of Pernambuco, Brazil, 118 km from Recife, capital of the state of Pernambuco, with an estimated (IBGE 2020) population of 12,170 inhabitants.

Geography
 State - Pernambuco
 Region - Zona da mata Pernambucana
 Boundaries - Camutanga   (N);  Timbaúba and Aliança   (S);  Timbaúba  (W); Itambé   (E)
 Area - 92.1 km2
 Elevation - 96 m
 Hydrography - Goiana River
 Vegetation - Subcaducifólia forest
 Climate - Hot tropical and humid
 Annual average temperature - 25.2°C
 Distance to Recife - 118 km

Economy
The main economic activities in Ferreiros are based in footwear industry, commerce and agribusiness, especially sugarcane, bananas; and livestock such as cattle and poultry.

Economic indicators

Economy by Sector
2006

Health indicators

References

Municipalities in Pernambuco